Elijah Brown (born August 14, 1999) is an American actor. He is known for his role as Dylan Walker on the Freeform series Pretty Little Liars: The Perfectionists (2019). He currently stars as Otto "Obie" Bergmann IV on the HBO Max series Gossip Girl (2021–present).

Early and personal life 
Born on August 13, 1999, he is originally from Eugene, Oregon. His mother, Katie Brown, had a clothing line before becoming a real estate agent. Brown has a younger sister, Sasha. In high school, Brown was part of South Eugene Theater.

As of 2021, Brown resides in Brooklyn, New York to be closer to the set of Gossip Girl.

Career 
In March 2018, it was announced that Brown had been cast in the Freeform mystery series, Pretty Little Liars: The Perfectionists. Brown played Dylan Walker as part of the main cast of the series, which was his first audition and first on-screen role. The series premiered on March 20, 2019, and ended its 10-episode run on May 22, 2019, being officially cancelled after one season in September 2019. Brown had a guest role as Dave on the Netflix series, Spinning Out. He was featured in two episodes of the series sole season, which was released on January 1, 2020. In December 2019, it was announced that Brown had been cast in the film Run Hide Fight. Brown played Tristan Voy, the main antagonist of the film, which had its world premiere at the Venice Film Festival on September 10, 2020.

Brown starred as Brett Blackmore, the lead role, in the film The F**k-It List, which was released on Netflix on July 1, 2020. In March 2020, it was announced that Brown had joined the main cast of Gossip Girl on HBO Max. Brown portrays Otto "Obie" Bergmann IV on the series, which premiered on July 8, 2021.

Filmography

Film

Television

References

External links 
 

1999 births
Living people
American male television actors